Tomi Sallinen (born 11 February 1989) is a Finnish professional ice hockey center who currently plays for Luleå HF of the Swedish Hockey League (SHL). Sallinen previously played in the KHL for Kunlun Red Star and Neftekhimik Nijnekamsk.

Playing career
Sallinen started his Liiga career with his hometown club, Espoo Blues. In 2008 and 2011, he made the Liiga finals with the Blues, but did not capture the title. On 11 April 2014, Sallinen left the Blues to sign a one-year contract in Sweden with Leksands IF of the Swedish Hockey League (SHL). Leksand was relegated in the 2014–15 SHL season, and Sallinen signed with SHL rivals Djurgårdens IF in April 2015.

He left Sweden at the conclusion of the 2015-16 campaign to further his career in the Kontinental Hockey League (KHL), landing a deal with HC Neftekhimik Nizhnekamsk. In November 2016, he transferred to fellow KHL side HC Kunlun Red Star.

On 14 September 2017 Sallinen was signed to a one-month contract by EHC Kloten, valid through October 15. He was signed as an injury replacement for fellow countryman, Tommi Santala.

As a free agent prior to the 2018–19 season, Sallinen returned for a second stint in Sweden, initially agreeing to a contract with Färjestad BK of the SHL on 22 May 2018. Unable to fully integrate into Farjestad's squad, Sallinen posted 4 points in 9 games before he was released from his contract on 18 December 2018. He remained in the SHL, transferring as a free agent to join Brynäs IF on 28 December 2018.

International play

Sallinen won silver representing Finland at the 2014 and 2016 World Championships.

Career statistics

Regular season and playoffs

International

References

External links

1989 births
Living people
Brynäs IF players
Djurgårdens IF Hockey players
Espoo Blues players
Sportspeople from Espoo
Färjestad BK players
EHC Kloten players
HC Kometa Brno players
Leksands IF players
Luleå HF players
HC Neftekhimik Nizhnekamsk players
HC Kunlun Red Star players
Finnish expatriate ice hockey players in Sweden
Finnish expatriate ice hockey players in Russia
Finnish ice hockey centres
Finnish expatriate ice hockey players in China
Finnish expatriate ice hockey players in Switzerland
Finnish expatriate ice hockey players in the Czech Republic